Ingvar Pettersson may refer to:

Ingvar Pettersson (racewalker), Swedish athlete
Ingvar Petersson, Swedish footballer